The 2015–16 season was Rotherham United's 91st season in their existence and the second consecutive season in the Championship. Last season, Rotherham secured their place in this season's championship with a 21st-placed finish, 5 points from the relegation zone. Along with competing in the Championship, the club also participated in the FA Cup, at which they entered in the third round, and League Cup.

Key events
On 8 July 2015, Eric Black was appointed first-team coach, after leaving Wigan Athletic at the end of the previous season.

On 23 July 2015, it was revealed that defender Kirk Broadfoot had been given a 10-game ban for the start of the upcoming season due to sectarian abuse. The incident occurred on 14 March 2015 in a home encounter against Wigan Athletic, where he was deemed by an FA tribunal to have made sectarian comments about Wigan's James McClean. As well as the 10-game ban, Broadfoot was also ordered to pay £7,500 and complete an education programme. It is currently the longest ban for verbal abuse in English football history.

On 3 September 2015, Steve Evans appointed midfielder Lee Frecklington as the new club captain. Frecklington replaced Greg Halford as the captain for the season, with Evans citing that Halford had would be able to focus on his individual game as a result of this decision.

On 28 September 2015, the club released a statement detailing that Steve Evans and Paul Raynor had left the club after three years in charge. The two parties were stated as wanting to move in "different directions" with the club, resulting in Evans and Raynor leaving the club. First-team coach Eric Black would take temporary charge of the team until Evans' successor was appointed.

On 9 October 2015, Rotherham United announced the appointment of former Leeds United head coach Neil Redfearn as the new manager of the club. Redfearn agreed a two and a half year deal with the club. He was unveiled in an official press conference on the following Monday, 12 October.

On 3 December 2015, Rotherham suspended new signing Simon Lenighan following his trial for assaulting three women. Rotherham also opened their own investigation into the matter. The investigation resulted in the termination of Lenighan's contract on 4 February 2016.

On 11 December 2015, Andrew Hughes was appointed as the first team development coach.

On 25 January 2016, Eric Black left the club by mutual agreement, to become Assistant Manager at Aston Villa.

On 4 February 2016, the club confirmed the appointment of Nicky Eaden for a second spell as Assistant Manager. Eaden left his role as a coach with Leicester City Under 21s prior to the confirmation. This was Eaden's second spell in the management team at the club, having previously been appointed by Andy Liddell in 2011.

On 8 February 2016, it was announced that Neil Redfearn had been relieved of his managerial duties. Redfearn had been in charge of the team for 21 games, losing 14 of them and with a win percentage of 23.8%. The following day, the club announced that coach Andy Hughes had also left the club  and that Nicky Eaden would take charge of the first team until a new manager was appointed.

On 11 February 2016, the club announced the appointment of Neil Warnock as manager and Kevin Blackwell as assistant manager, both until the end of the season. As a consequence, Nicky Eaden was demoted to first team coach.

On 18 May 2016, it was announced that Warnock would not be continuing as manager. Along with assistant Blackwell and Ronnie Jepson, he left the club with immediate effect.

Squad statistics

Player statistics

(starts) + (substitute apps)

Goalscorers

Pre-season friendlies

Competitions

Championship
On 17 June 2015, the fixtures for the forthcoming season were announced.

League table

Results summary

Matchday summary

Fixtures

FA Cup

On 7 December 2015, the draw for the third round of the FA Cup was made.

League Cup

On 16 June 2015, the first round draw for the League Cup was made.

Transfers

Transfers in

Transfers out

Loans in

Loans out

References

Rotherham United
Rotherham United F.C. seasons